Son of man came to serve refers to a specific episode in the New Testament. In the Gospel of Matthew  and the Gospel of Mark , Jesus explains that he "came as Son of man to give his life as ransom". The ransom paid by the Son of man is an element of a common doctrine of atonement in Christianity.

 
You know that those who are regarded as rulers of the Gentiles lord it over them, and their high officials exercise authority over them. Not so with you. Instead, whoever wants to become great among you must be your servant, and whoever wants to be first must be slave of all. For even the Son of Man did not come to be served, but to serve, and to give his life as a ransom for many.

Concept of "servant leadership:" 

Jesus said the "leader" is "as the one who serves" in the Gospel of Luke 22:24-27 ESV:  

A dispute also arose among them, as to which of them was to be regarded as the greatest. And he said to them, “The kings of the Gentiles exercise lordship over them, and those in authority over them are called benefactors. But not so with you. Rather, let the greatest among you become as the youngest, and the leader as one who serves. For who is the greater, one who reclines at table or one who serves? Is it not the one who reclines at table? But I am among you as the one who serves.The identification of Jesus with the Son of man, in the context of the Book of Daniel (7:13–14), places the death of Jesus and the ransom he pays at a higher level of prominence than other prophets and martyrs, even his contemporary John the Baptist.

See also
 Gospel harmony
 Life of Jesus in the New Testament

Notes

Sayings of Jesus
Gospel of Matthew